The 1970 Iowa gubernatorial election was held on November 3, 1970. Incumbent Republican Robert D. Ray narrowly defeated Democratic nominee Robert D. Fulton with 50.98% of the vote.

Primary elections
Primary elections were held on June 2, 1970.

Democratic primary

Candidates
Robert D. Fulton, former Governor
William J. Gannon, State Representative
Robert L. Nereim

Results

Republican primary

Candidates
Robert D. Ray, incumbent Governor

Results

General election

Candidates
Major party candidates
Robert D. Ray, Republican
Robert D. Fulton, Democratic 

Other candidates
Robert Dilley, American Independent

Results

References

1970
Iowa